Second Cabinet of Ivan Goremykin – composition of the Council of Ministers of the Russian Empire, under the leadership of Ivan Goremykin, worked from February 12, 1914 to February 2, 1916.

As in the First Cabinet, Goremykin continued to resist the State Duma, in particular the Progressive Bloc, threatening to dissolve parliament. Prime Minister threatened to dissolve Parliament, which is intended to form a "Government of trust", thereby subjecting the Council of Ministers of the State Duma.

February 2, 1916, after repeated requests Ivan Goremykin, Nicholas II sent a government to resign.

Ministers

References

Goremykin
Cabinets established in 1914